The province of Arezzo is the easternmost province in the Tuscany region of central Italy. Its capital is the city of Arezzo. The province is bordered by the regions of Marche, Emilia-Romagna, Umbria, and the provinces Siena and Florence of Tuscany.

The north of the province of Arezzo contains the Pratomagno and Casentino mountain ranges and valleys, and the southern areas of the region contain the fertile Tiber and Chiana valleys. The province capital Arezzo was a major Etruscan urban centre known as Aritim, and a wall was built around the province in this period of rule. In Roman times, the settlement was given the latinized name Arretium and expanded down from the hills. Arretium assisted Ancient Rome in the Punic Wars against Ancient Carthage. After attacks from barbarians, the settlement mostly disappeared in around 400 AD.

Towards the end of the 11th century, the settlement grew again into a city, despite being located near the powerful nations of Siena and Florence. Its location led to its ownership changing repeatedly; Florence owned the province after the Battle of Campaldino, later lost authority over it, and then annexed it again in 1384. Florence possessed the province until 1859, when Tuscany was annexed to the Kingdom of Sardinia during the Risorgimento. The province is in close proximity to Camaldoli, ancestral seat of the Camaldolese monks.

Communes
The main comuni by population are:

Government

List of presidents of the province of Arezzo

References

External links

  Official website 

 
A
Arezzo